Nikola Plećaš (born January 10, 1948) is a former Yugoslavian professional basketball player. At a height of 1.88 m (6'2") tall, and a weight of 86 kg (190 lbs.), he played at the point guard and shooting guard positions. 

He was considered to be one of the greatest European basketball players of the 1960s and 1970s. During his playing career, he was nicknamed Sveti Nikola. Plećaš is an ethnic Serb.

Club career
Plećaš began his playing career with the youth teams of Mladost Zagreb. He then played professionally with Lokomotiva Zagreb and Kvarner Rijeka. He was a member FIBA European Selection team, in 1970 and 1972. He won the European-wide 3rd-tier level FIBA Korać Cup championship, in 1972.

Yugoslavian national team
Plećaš was a member of the senior Yugoslavian national basketball team. With Yugoslavia's senior national team, he won the silver medal at the 1968 Summer Olympics, the gold medal at the 1970 FIBA World Championship, and the silver medal at the 1974 FIBA World Championship. He also played at the 1972 Summer Olympics.

See also
 Yugoslav First Federal Basketball League career stats leaders

References

Sources
 Nikola Plećaš - Scorer with no flaw

External links
FIBA Profile
FIBA Europe Profile

1948 births
Living people
People from Gračac
Serbs of Croatia
Basketball players at the 1968 Summer Olympics
Basketball players at the 1972 Summer Olympics
FIBA EuroBasket-winning players
KK Cibona players
KK Gorica coaches
Olympic basketball players of Yugoslavia
Olympic medalists in basketball
Olympic silver medalists for Yugoslavia
Yugoslav men's basketball players
1970 FIBA World Championship players
1974 FIBA World Championship players
Mediterranean Games gold medalists for Yugoslavia
Competitors at the 1967 Mediterranean Games
Medalists at the 1968 Summer Olympics
Point guards
Shooting guards
FIBA World Championship-winning players
Mediterranean Games medalists in basketball
KK Kvarner players